Martin Ferreira (born 24 January 1989) is a South African rugby union player, who most recently played Currie Cup rugby with . His regular position is hooker.

Career

Youth and amateur
He represented Eastern Province at the 2005 Under-16 Grant Khomo Week and 2007 Under-18 Craven Week tournaments.

He was also a member of the  squad for the 2010 Varsity Cup competition, but failed to make an appearance.

SWD Eagles

He made eight starts and one substitute appearance in the competition proper, scoring three tries.

Eastern Province Kings

In 2014, he linked up with the  prior to the 2014 Currie Cup Premier Division season.

He was included in the  Super Rugby squad for the 2016 Super Rugby season.

References

South African rugby union players
South African people of Portuguese descent
Living people
1989 births
Rugby union players from Port Elizabeth
SWD Eagles players
Southern Kings players
Rugby union hookers